Tsang Kin-shing (born 1957), nicknamed "The Bull" by his supporters, is a Hong Kong politician who formerly served as a member of the Legislative Council and later the Eastern District Council. He is most well known as the founder of the controversial Citizens' Radio.  He is also a member of the League of Social Democrats.

Arrest
On 8 December 2020, Tsang was arrested for his alleged involvement in the unauthorized 1 July march that year. Seven other democrats were arrested the same day on similar charges.

References

External links
Bull Tsang - His personal website 

1957 births
Living people
District councillors of Eastern District
Democratic Party (Hong Kong) politicians
Social Democratic Forum politicians
League of Social Democrats politicians
HK LegCo Members 1995–1997